Te Aponga Uira O Tumu-Te-Varovaro (TAU) is a Cook Islands electricity generator, distributor and retailer which provides electricity to the island of Rarotonga. It is responsible for 90% of the Cook Islands' electricity generation. It is a state-owned enterprise, wholly owned by the Cook Islands Government through the Cook Islands Investment Corporation.

Te Aponga Uira was established by the Te Aponga Uira O Tumu-Te-Varovaro Act 1991. Structured as a perpetual body corporate, it has the statutory objectives of "provid[ing] energy to all consumers in a reliable and economical manner" while operating in "an efficient and profitable manner having due regard to the interests of the community". Upon its creation it took over the assets and liabilities of the Cook Islands' Department of Electric Power Supply. Originally responsible to the Minister of Energy and with statutory advice functions, control was transferred in 1999 to the Cook Islands Investment Corporation, and a social responsibility requirement was imposed. It must also conform to government policy directives, such as the Cook Islands Renewable Electricity Chart.

The company operates two power stations on Rarotonga:

The company had a net metering policy in place since November 2009 to encourage the installation of distributed solar generation, but reversed its policy in 2015 over concerns about grid stability.

During the COVID-19 pandemic the company provided free electricity to its domestic users and discounted electricity to businesses.

See also
 Energy in the Cook Islands

References

Rarotonga
Energy in the Cook Islands
Companies of the Cook Islands